The Robbers is a 1962 Spanish crime film directed by Francisco Rovira Beleta. It was entered into the 12th Berlin International Film Festival.

Cast
 Pierre Brice - El Señorito
 Manuel Gil - Ramón Orea Bellido 'Chico'
 Julián Mateos - Carmelo Barrachina 'Compadre'
 Agnès Spaak - Isabel
 Antonia Oyamburu
 Rosa Fúster
 Carlos Ibarzábal
 Alejo del Peral
 Mariano Martín
 Carmen Pradillo
 Carlos Miguel Solá
 Camino Delgado - (as Mª Camino Delgado)
 Ana Morera
 Gustavo Re - Cómplice del mago que acosa a Isabel
 Joaquín Ferré
 Enrique Guitart - Abogado
 María Asquerino - Asunción

References

External links

1962 films
1960s Spanish-language films
1962 crime films
Spanish black-and-white films
Films directed by Francisco Rovira Beleta
Spanish crime films
1960s Spanish films